"From a Window/This Morning" are songs by Northern Uproar, released together as a single in 1996. The single was released in January 1996 and reached number 17 in the UK singles chart, making it by far their highest chart placing to date. The single also charted at #44 in Sweden.

Track listing
"From a Window"
"Credibility"
"My Mind's Eye"
"This Morning"

References

1996 singles
Northern Uproar songs
1996 songs
Song articles with missing songwriters